

Player statistics
Appearances for competitive matches only

|}

Goals

Division 1 Norra

Svenska Cupen

Friendlies

Competitions

Overall

Division 1 Norra

League table

Svenska Cupen

1997–98

Source: https://www.rsssf.org/tablesz/zwed98.html

1998–99

Friendlies

References

1998
Swedish football clubs 1998 season
1998 in Swedish football